Christian Parker (born December 23, 1991) is an American football coach who is the defensive backs coach for the Denver Broncos of the National Football League (NFL). He was previously a defensive quality control for the Green Bay Packers, and also spent time as an analyst at Texas A&M and Notre Dame.

Coaching career 
Parker got his start in coaching working as the cornerbacks coach at Virginia State in 2013, later shifting to coach all defensive backs in 2014. He also spent time at Norfolk State as both their safeties and cornerbacks coach as well as assistant recruiting coordinator. Parker was hired to coach the cornerbacks at William & Mary in 2017, but left to accept a position at Notre Dame. He was hired as a defensive analyst at Texas A&M in 2018 on Jimbo Fisher's inaugural staff.

Green Bay Packers 
Parker was hired as a defensive quality control coach for the Green Bay Packers in 2019. While with Green Bay, he assisted defensive coordinator Mike Pettine in breaking down film on opponents and coordinating the scout team.

Denver Broncos 
Parker was named the defensive backs coach for the Denver Broncos on February 8, 2021.

References

External links 
 Virginia State Trojans bio
 Richmond Spiders bio

1991 births
Living people
People from Henrico County, Virginia
Sportspeople from Richmond, Virginia
Players of American football from Virginia
American football wide receivers
American football cornerbacks
Richmond Spiders football players
Virginia State Trojans football coaches
Norfolk State Spartans football coaches
William & Mary Tribe football coaches
Notre Dame Fighting Irish football coaches
Texas A&M Aggies football coaches
Green Bay Packers coaches
Denver Broncos coaches